The Inshū dialect (Japanese: 因州弁 inshū-ben) is a Japanese dialect spoken in the Inaba region (formerly Inaba Province) of eastern Tottori Prefecture. It may also be called the Tottori dialect (Japanese: 鳥取弁 tottori-ben), though this is not to be confused with other dialects that are also spoken in the prefecture, namely the Kurayoshi and West Hōki dialects. It is considered an East San’in dialect of the wider Chūgoku dialect group. In parts of northern Hyōgo Prefecture that neighbour Tottori, specifically in the Tajima region (in towns like Shin'onsen), a similar dialect to the Inshu dialect is spoken. It bares many similarities to its close relative, the Kurayoshi dialect of central Tottori (formerly eastern Hōki) but retains some notable differences.

Phonology 
In the San’in area (including Tottori) the long o (お) sound derived from the au (あう) diphthong of the Heian and Kamakura periods has morphed to a long a (あぁ). Consequently, the volitional/persuasive ikō (行こう let’s go) is pronounced ikā (行かあ) and the conjecture-expressing ~ darō (～だろう) becomes ~ darā (～だらあ). Although usually said as kauta (買うた) in San’yō dialects, katta (買った bought) becomes kāta (買あた) or simply remains the same. It's pitch accent is the chūrin (中輪 ‘middle ring’) Tokyo standard, a trait that can also be seen in the Kurayoshi dialect.

Although diphthong merging is virtually absent in Tottori City, it does occur in the former districts of Yazu and Iwami. In Yazu, the diphthong ai (あい) merges to an ē (えぇ) like in akai (赤い red) → akē (あけえ). In Iwami, ai merges instead to yā (ゃあ) like in akai (赤い red) → akyā (あきゃあ). Although almost non-existent elsewhere in Tottori, in the town of Chizu there is a phenomenon of merging the diphthong oi (おい) to ē (えぇ) like in kuroi (黒い black) → kure (くれえ).

In contrast to most other Western Japanese dialects and in kind with more distant groups such as the Kanto dialects, across Tottori there is frequent silencing of vowels. When unaccented, voiceless consonants (shi (し), ki (き), etc.) become silent.

Grammar 
As a San'in dialect, Inshū dialect speakers use ~ da (～だ) (as opposed to ~ja (～じゃ) in the San'yō dialects) as their copula. Nevertheless, in some towns that are close to Okayama Prefecture, such as Chizu and Wakasa, ~ja (～じゃ) is used instead. Within Tottori, the conjunctive forms of u-ending Godan verbs experience geminate consonant (small tsu っ) insertion, with euphonic change to u (う) only occurring in Chizu. For reason and cause, ~ (da) ke (～(だ)けー) is used as an equivalent to ~ (da) kara (～(だ)から because, so ). Like other San’in region dialects, ongoing actions and completed actions are expressed separately with ~yoru (～ょーる) and ~toru (～とる), respectively.

References

Citations 

Japanese dialects
Tottori Prefecture
Culture in Tottori Prefecture
Chūgoku region